Croxton is a village and civil parish in the English county of Norfolk, within the district of Breckland. Croxton is located 2.2 miles north of Thetford and 26 miles south-east of Norwich.

History
Croxton's name is of mixed Anglo-Saxon and Viking origin deriving from an amalgamation of the Old English and Old Norse for 'Krokr's' farmstead or settlement.

In the Domesday Book, Croxton is recorded as a settlement of 21 households in the hundred of Grimshoe. In 1086, the village was part of the estate of King William.

Geography
According to the 2011 Census, Croxton has 445 residents living in 194 households.

Croxton falls within the constituency of South West Norfolk and is represented at Parliament by Liz Truss MP of the Conservative Party.

All Saints' Church
Croxton's parish church is one of the 124 remaining Anglo-Saxon round-tower churches in Norfolk. The church was significantly remodelled in the Nineteenth Century and features a rare example of a Continental church spire.

War Memorial
All Saints' Church holds an elaborate wooden carved memorial to the fallen from the First World War, listing the following names:
 Captain Duncan C. Graham (d.1917), 7th Battalion, Royal Norfolk Regiment
 Corporal George Eagle (d.1918), 4th Battalion, Royal Fusiliers
 Lance-Corporal Percy Meadows (d.1917), 10th (Hackney) Battalion, London Regiment
 Private Isaac W. Moule (1895-1915), 1st Battalion, Grenadier Guards
 Private George Boughen (1896-1916), 3/1st Brigade, Norfolk Yeomanry
 Private George Vincent (1886-1917), 7th Battalion, North Staffordshire Regiment
 Private Alfred Linge (1899-1918), 12th Battalion, East Surrey Regiment
 Private Alfred H. Gathergood (d.1917), 8th Battalion, East Yorkshire Regiment
 Douglas Bell
 William Cant
 Bertie Cooper
 William Haines
 William Matthews
 Alfred Nichols
 William Shinks
 Alfred Vincent
 Harry Williams

The memorial also features an engraving and separate memorial to Second-Lieutenant R. G. T. Meade (1895-1917) of the XIV King's Hussars who was killed fighting at the Battle of Ramadi. Meade is buried in Grave V.D.4 of the Baghdad North Gate War Cemetery in Iraq.

Notes

External links

Villages in Norfolk
Civil parishes in Norfolk
Breckland District